Wilfrid Lawson may refer to:

 Sir Wilfrid Lawson, 1st Baronet, of Isell (c. 1610–1688), MP for Cumberland 1659 and 1660 and Cockermouth 1660–1679
 Sir Wilfrid Lawson, 2nd Baronet, of Isell (1664–1704), MP for Cockermouth 1690–1695
 Sir Wilfrid Lawson, 3rd Baronet, of Isell (1697–1737), MP for Boroughbridge 1718–1722 and Cockermouth 1722–1737
 Sir Wilfrid Lawson, 4th Baronet (c. 1732–1739)
 Sir Wilfrid Lawson, 8th Baronet (c. 1707–1762), MP for Cumberland 1761–1762
 Sir Wilfrid Lawson, 10th Baronet (c. 1764–1806)
Wilfrid Lawson (MP for Cockermouth) ( – ), High Sheriff 1678. Of Brayton
Sir Wilfrid Lawson, 1st Baronet, of Brayton (1795–1867)
Sir Wilfrid Lawson, 2nd Baronet, of Brayton (1829–1906), his son, British Liberal Party politician
Sir Wilfrid Lawson, 3rd Baronet, of Brayton (1862–1937), his son, also a Liberal Party politician and MP
Wilfred Lawson (died 1632) (1545–1632), English MP for Cumberland at various times between 1593 and 1621
Wilfrid Lawson (actor) (1900–1966), British character actor

See also
 Wilfred (given name)
 Sir Wilfrid Lawson, 3rd Baronet (disambiguation)
 Sir Wilfrid Lawson, 2nd Baronet (disambiguation)
 Sir Wilfrid Lawson, 1st Baronet (disambiguation)